Maroboduus is a genus of cicadas in the family Cicadidae. There are at least two described species in Maroboduus.

Species
These two species belong to the genus Maroboduus:
 Maroboduus fractus Distant, 1920 c g
 Maroboduus maxicapsulifera (Boulard, 1986) c g
Data sources: i = ITIS, c = Catalogue of Life, g = GBIF, b = Bugguide.net

References

Further reading

 
 
 
 

Tettigomyiinae
Cicadidae genera